Galton Village is a residential area of Smethwick, West Midlands, England. It takes its name from the iconic nearby Galton Bridge that was named after local business man Samuel Galton whose land the new BCN Main Line (lower level) canal was built through, the canal runs behind Galton Village as does the Stour Valley section of West Coast Mainline. The Oldbury Road runs through the area which begins next to Smethwick’s Galton Bridge railway station and ends at Spon Lane, next to a small shopping centre.

The original housing estate on the site of Galton Village, built by the new County Borough of Warley council in the late 1960s, was known as the West Smethwick Estate. This estate consisted of maisonettes and flats which were made from concrete, and earned it the nickname "Concrete Jungle". By the 1980s, many of the flats were empty or in disrepair, and the estate was blighted by unemployment and crime. At the beginning of the 1990s, Sandwell MBC decided to demolish the estate.

Between 1992 and 1997, the estate was completely redeveloped. The swathe of concrete buildings had been cleared to make way for modern and attractive low-rise housing. The West Smethwick Estate title was abandoned in favour of Galton Village.

Just to the south of Galton Village is West Smethwick and its park; the area sits on the border with West Bromwich to the north and Oldbury to the west. As stated above, the Oldbury Road runs through its heart; this is a collective main thoroughfare the A457 from Birmingham.

It is not to be confused with the Galton council estate in neighbouring Oldbury, which was developed during the 1920s and 1930s.

References 

Areas of Sandwell
Smethwick